Telipna is a genus of butterflies in the family Lycaenidae. The species of this genus are endemic to the Afrotropical realm.

Species
Telipna acraea (Westwood, [1851])
Telipna acraeoides  (Grose-Smith & Kirby, 1890)
Telipna albofasciata  Aurivillius, 1910
Telipna atrinervis  Hulstaert, 1924
Telipna aurivillii  Rebel, 1914
Telipna cameroonensis  Jackson, 1969
Telipna centralis  Libert, 2005
Telipna citrimaculata  Schultze, 1916
Telipna consanguinea  Rebel, 1914
Telipna cuypersi  Libert, 2005
Telipna ducarmei  Libert, 2005
Telipna erica  Suffert, 1904
Telipna hollandi  Joicey & Talbot, 1921
Telipna ja  Bethune-Baker, 1926
Telipna kaputui  Libert, 2005
Telipna kayonza  Jackson, 1969
Telipna kigoma  Kielland, 1978
Telipna nyanza  Neave, 1904
Telipna plagiata  Joicey & Talbot, 1921
Telipna rothi  (Grose-Smith, 1898)
Telipna rufilla  (Grose-Smith, 1901)
Telipna ruspinoides  Schultze, 1923
Telipna sanguinea  (Plötz, 1880)
Telipna semirufa  (Grose-Smith & Kirby, 1889)
Telipna sheffieldi  Bethune-Baker, 1926
Telipna sulpitia  Hulstaert, 1924
Telipna transverstigma  Druce, 1910
Telipna villiersi  Stempffer, 1965

References

 Seitz, A. Die Gross-Schmetterlinge der Erde 13: Die Afrikanischen Tagfalter. Plate XIII 61

Poritiinae
Taxa named by Per Olof Christopher Aurivillius
Lycaenidae genera